Mmuseumm is a modern natural history museum located in lower Manhattan in New York City, dedicated to its signature curatorial style of "Object Journalism" and draws parallels to the older cabinet of curiosities model.

History
The Mmuseumm was founded by Alex Kalman and the Safdie brothers. It curates its content and locations by "seasons", reflective of its original summer hours, and has called two locations on Cortlandt Alley between Franklin Street and White Street, sometimes known as Mmuseumm Alley, home. Mmuseumm is dedicated to the curation and exhibition of contemporary artifacts to illustrate the modern world. 

Mmuseumm's first wing, Mmuseumm 1, opened in 2012 in a former elevator shaft. The second wing, Mmuseumm 2, opened in 2015 three doors down.  The museum, which totals 36 square feet, is accessible 24 hours a day via peepholes in its door.

References

External links

 

Museums in Manhattan
Museums established in 2012
2012 establishments in New York City
Lower Manhattan